Theistic Naturalism is a series of religious beliefs that rejects divine intervention while keeping theism.

It is different from traditional or classical theism. Theistic naturalists think evolution and naturalism can be in tune with Christianity.

Notable theistic naturalists 

 Arthur Peacocke
 John B. Cobb

Criticism 
Theistic naturalism has been called out as expanding borders of naturalism too the point anything goes.

Jeffrey Koperski said theistic naturalism sounds like a oxymoron and that both naturalism and theism are incompatible.

References 

Naturalism (philosophy)
Theism